Anyang is a prefecture-level city in Henan province, China. The northernmost city in Henan, Anyang borders Puyang to the east, Hebi and Xinxiang to the south, and the provinces of Shanxi and Hebei to its west and north respectively.

It had a total population of 5,477,614 as of the 2020 census, 2,675,523 of whom lived in the built-up (or metro) area made of four urban districts and Anyang and Tangyin counties, now largely agglomerated with the city proper.

Anyang is the location of the ancient city of Yin, which was the capital of the Shang dynasty and the first stable capital of China. Henan once had the largest population in China.

History

Early history

Xiaonanhai, on the far western edge of the city, was home to prehistoric cavemen during the Stone Age. Over 7,000 artifacts (including stone tools and animal bone fossils) have been unearthed here, representing what has been dubbed the Xiaonanhai culture.

Around 2000 BC, the legendary sage-kings Zhuanxu and Emperor Ku are said to have established their capitals in the area around Anyang from where they ruled their kingdoms. Today their mausoleums are situated in Sanyang village south of Neihuang County.

The city, known as Yin, was the first stable capital in Chinese history and from that point on the dynasty that founded it would also become known as the Yin Dynasty.

The capital served 12 kings in 8 generations including Wu Ding, under whom the dynasty reached the zenith of its power, until it was wiped out along with the dynasty that was founded by King Wu of the Zhou in 1046 BC.

Anyang's Tangyin County was the seat of Yue Village, the birthplace of the famous Song dynasty general, Yue Fei. This was also the historic home of Zhou Tong, Yue's military arts tutor (though fictional sources place him in Shaanxi).

Modern era

The town was known as Zhangde until 1912, when it was given its present name of Anyang, following the establishment of the Republic of China.

In August 1949, Anyang prefecture was detached from Henan andalong with Puyang and Xinxiangconsigned to the short lived experimental province of Pingyuan by the ruling Communist government. All three were eventually returned to Henan's territory in November 1953, with the dissolution of Pingyuan.

Geography and climate

The city's elevation is generally higher in the west, with the foothills of the Taihang Mountains running through the area, and lower in the east, which comprises part of the North China Plain.

Anyang has a four-season, monsoon-influenced humid continental climate/semi-arid climate (Köppen Dwa/BSk). Summers are hot and humid, with July averaging . With monthly percent possible sunshine ranging from 43% in July to 58% in May, the city receives 2,225 hours of bright sunshine annually, with April to June the sunniest period.

Administration 
The prefecture-level city of Anyang administers 4 districts, 1 county-level city and 4 counties. These, in turn, administer 46 subdistricts, 66 towns, and 23 townships, which then administer 302 residential communities and 2,979 administrative villages.

Beiguan District
Wenfeng District
Yindu District
Long'an District
Linzhou City
Anyang County
Tangyin County
Hua County
Neihuang County

Demographics 
Per the 2020 Chinese Census, Anyang has a population of 5.48 million people. The overwhelming majority of the city's population is ethnically Han Chinese, with ethnic minorities constituting a population of around 10,000 people. 43 different ethnic minorities live in the city, with prominent ethnic minority communities including the Hui, Mongols, Manchus, Zhuang, Miao, Tibetans, and the Yi.

Economy 
Anyang is a largely industrial city, with major industries including the production of metals such as iron and steel, coal coking, and clothing production. Major Chinese steel producer Shagang Group has operations in Anyang. Major mineral reserves in Anyang include dolomite, potassium-bearing shale, nepheline syenite, quartzite, limestone, and clay.

The city's total gross domestic product (GDP) totaled 243.55 billion renminbi (RMB) as of 2021, a 5% increase from the prior year. Anyang's primary sector comprised 9.7% of the city's GDP, the secondary sector comprised 43.7%, and the tertiary sector comprised 46.6%.

The per capita disposable income in Anyang totaled 27,365 RMB as of 2021, an increase of 7.2% from 2020. The per capita disposable income of Anyang's urban residents was 37,464 RMB, a 6% annual increase, and the per capita disposable income of rural residents was 18,424 RMB, an 8.4% annual increase.

Sixteen foreign-funded enterprises (joint ventures, cooperative enterprises, and wholly foreign-owned enterprises) have been established in Anyang.

Tourism 

Anyang city is an ancient city with a history of over 3,000 years and is one of the Eight Ancient Capitals of China, and also one of the best preserved. It is one of the key birthplaces of Chinese ancient culture. Here are the primitive caves of 25,000 years ago, the overlapping strata of the Yangshao Culture, Longshan Culture and Xiaotun Culture, the memorial mausoleums of ancient Emperor Zhuanxu and Emperor Ku over 4,000 years ago, the first library of inscriptions on bones and tortoise shells, the Soul Spring Temple, known as the "First Ancient Buddhist Temple in Henan", and 10,000-Buddha Ravine, as well as unique Wenfeng Pagoda, Xiuding Temple Pagoda and Mingfu Temple Pagoda. The city has three large museums: the Anyang Museum, the National Museum of Chinese Writing, and the Yinxu Museum on the ruins and royal tombs of the Shang Dynasty. Anyang also has beautiful natural scenery—the Taihang Linlu Hill Scenic Area on the 400-km Taihang Mountains and the grand 1,500-km Red Flag Canal.

Changchun Temple
Changchun Temple, a Taoist shrine, was built on the hillside of the mountains surrounding it during the Tang dynasty. It was officially opened to the public on 1 May 2014, after a period of cautious restoration.

Tianning Temple
Tianning Si (Mansion Temple) was established during the Zhou dynasty, and has recently been restored by the Protection and Research Institute of Ancient Architecture of Anyang City, and opened to the public. The main structures within the temple compound include: the gate house, the three-room (8.4 m x 14 m) Hall of the Heavenly King with hanging-eaves over the gables rebuilt in 2002, the slightly larger Precious Hall of the Great Hero (17.8 m x 11.65 m) with single-eave gabled roof originally from the Qing dynasty and rebuilt in 2001, and the Wenfeng Pagoda.

Wenfeng Pagoda
Wenfeng Ta (Literature Peak Pagoda) on the grounds of the Tianning Temple is believed to have been constructed in 925 and is known, from inscriptions concerning the reconstruction of the temple, to have been in place by 952. The current pagoda was constructed during the Ming dynasty and received its current name during the Qing dynasty due to its proximity to the Confucian temple. The five-story dark red brick octagonal tower is 38.65m high and is, unusually, larger at the top than the bottom and is topped with a 10-metre Lamaist stupa-style dagoba steeple. The pagoda stands on a two-metre-high stone pedestal and is decorated with multi-eave pent roofs and carvings of Buddhas and bodhisattvas. The unique pagoda is the symbol of Anyang.

Yinxu ruins and museum

This massive archaeological site was discovered in 1899, excavated in the decades that followed, and first opened to the public in the 1980s as the Garden Museum of Yinxu. The current Yinxu museum was opened on 16 March 2005, and includes the famous Tomb of Fu Hao.

The site was later designated a UNESCO World Heritage Sites in 2006.

See also
List of twin towns and sister cities in China
Historical capitals of China
History of the political divisions of China

Notes

External links

Government website of Anyang (in Simplified Chinese)
Official website of Anyang Foreign and Overseas Affairs Office (in Simplified Chinese)

 
Cities in Henan
Prefecture-level divisions of Henan